Andrew Cardozo is a Canadian senator from Ontario. He was appointed to the Senate of Canada on November 21, 2022, on the advice of Prime Minister Justin Trudeau.

Prior to his appointment to the Senate, Cardozo was the president of the Pearson Centre for Progressive Policy for nearly ten years. He is a former commissioner of the Canadian Radio-television and Telecommunications Commission.

References

Living people
21st-century Canadian politicians
Canadian senators from Ontario
Independent Canadian senators
Year of birth missing (living people)